This is the discography and music video information of American R&B girl group 3LW. Throughout their career, 3LW sold over 2.5 million records.

Studio albums

Singles

As lead artist

As featured artist

Promotional singles

Guest appearances

DVDs

Music videos

Notes

References

Contemporary R&B discographies
Discographies of American artists